Selce nad Blanco is a small settlement in the hills north of Blanca in the Municipality of Sevnica in east-central Slovenia. The area is part of the traditional region of Styria and is now included in the Lower Sava Statistical Region.

Name
The name of the settlement was changed from Selce to Selce nad Blanco in 1953.

References

External links
Selce nad Blanco at Geopedia

Populated places in the Municipality of Sevnica